Don Mike is a 1927 American silent Western film directed by Lloyd Ingraham and starring Fred Thomson, Ruth Clifford and Noah Young. It is set in Old California.

Cast
 Fred Thomson as Don Miguel Arguella 
 Ruth Clifford as Mary Kelsey 
 Noah Young as Reuben Pettigill 
 Albert Prisco as Don Luis Ybara 
 William Courtright as Gómez 
 Tom Bates as Jason Kelsey 
 Norma Marie as Dolores 
 Carmen Laroux as Carmen

References

Bibliography
 Donald W. McCaffrey & Christopher P. Jacobs. Guide to the Silent Years of American Cinema. Greenwood Publishing, 1999.

External links
 

1927 films
1927 Western (genre) films
1920s romance films
American black-and-white films
American romance films
Film Booking Offices of America films
Films directed by Lloyd Ingraham
Films set in California
Films set in the 19th century
Silent American Western (genre) films
1920s English-language films
1920s American films